Libenge is a town in Sud-Ubangi Province in the Democratic Republic of the Congo (DRC). The Congolese politician Léon Kengo was born in this town in 1935.

References

Populated places in Sud-Ubangi